Pa Qaleh-ye Khoskheh Rud (also Romanized as Pā Qal‘eh-ye Khoshkeh Rūd) is a village in Osmanvand Rural District, Firuzabad District, Kermanshah County, Kermanshah Province, Iran. At the 2006 census, its population was 45, in 9 families.

References 

Populated places in Kermanshah County